The Shire of Mulgrave was a local government area surrounding the City of Cairns in the Far North region of Queensland.

History

The Cairns Division was created on 11 November 1879 as one of 74 divisions around Queensland under the Divisional Boards Act 1879 with a population of 34.

On 3 June 1880, part of the Cairns Division was separated to create the Douglas Division.

On 3 September 1881, the Tinaroo Division was created on 3 September 1881 under the Divisional Boards Act 1879 out of parts of the Cairns, Hinchinbrook and Woothakata Divisions.

Following a petition by local residents, on 28 May 1885, the Borough of Cairns was established under the Local Government Act 1878, being excised from the Cairns Division.

With the passage of the Local Authorities Act 1902, the Cairns Division became the Shire of Cairns on 31 March 1903. Originally based in the town of Gordonvale, which historically was called Mulgrave, its offices  were located at Cairns Esplanade, Cairns.

On 20 December 1919, the Shire absorbed territory from the abolished Shire of Barron, which was divided between the Shires of Cairns and Shire of Woothakata.

On 16 November 1940, the Shire of Cairns was renamed Shire of Mulgrave.

The character of the Shire changed over time, and by the time of the 1991 census, 88% of the Shire's population resided within Cairns's metropolitan area. On 21 November 1991, the Electoral and Administrative Review Commission, created two years earlier, produced its second report, and recommended that local government boundaries in the Cairns area be rationalised, and that the Shire of Mulgrave be abolished and absorbed into the City of Cairns. The Local Government (Cairns, Douglas, Mareeba and Mulgrave) Regulation 1994 was gazetted on 16 December 1994. On 22 March 1995, the Shire was abolished and became part of the new City of Cairns.

The Mulgrave Shire Council Chambers were listed on the Queensland Heritage Register on 6 January 1999. As of 2016, it is used as the Cairns & Tropical North Visitor Information Centre.

Towns and localities
The Shire of Mulgrave included the following settlements:

Northern Mulgrave area:
 Barron
 Barron Gorge
 Brinsmead
 Buchan Point
 Caravonica
 Clifton Beach
 Ellis Beach
 Freshwater
 Holloways Beach
 Kamerunga
 Kewarra Beach
 Lamb Range
 Macalister Range
 Machans Beach
 Palm Cove
 Redlynch
 Smithfield
 Stratford
 Trinity Beach
 Trinity Park
 Yorkeys Knob

Southern Mulgrave area:
 Aloomba
 Babinda
 Bartle Frere
 Bayview Heights
 Bellenden Ker
 Bentley Park
 Bramston Beach
 Deeral
 East Russell
 East Trinity
 Edmonton
 Eubenangee1
 Fishery Falls
 Fitzroy Island
 Glen Boughton
 Goldsborough

 Gordonvale
 Green Hill
 Green Island
 Kamma
 Little Mulgrave
 Meringa
 Miriwinni
 Mount Peter
 Mount Sheridan
 Ngatjan1
 Packers Camp
 Waugh Pocket
 White Rock2
 Woopen Creek
 Wooroonooran3
 Woree
 Wrights Creek

1 - shared with Cassowary Coast Region
2 - not to be confused with White Rock in City of Ipswich
3 - shared with shared with Cassowary Coast Region and Tablelands Region

Population

Chairmen

Cairns Division (1880–1903)
The chairmen of the Cairns Division were:
 

 Richard Kingsford left to become Mayor of the newly formed Borough of Cairns in 1885.

Shire of Cairns (1903–1940)
Chairmen of the Shire of Cairns were:

Shire of Mulgrave (1940–1995)
The chairmen of the Shire of Mulgrave were:

Notable people
In addition to the chairmen, other notable people associated with the shire include:
 Bunny Adair, Member of the Queensland Legislative Assembly for Cook who was a Mulgrave Shire councillor from 1939 to 1946

References

External links
 Local Government (Cairns, Douglas, Mareeba and Mulgrave) Regulation 1994

Former local government areas of Queensland
1995 disestablishments in Australia
Populated places disestablished in 1995
1879 establishments in Australia